Heli Finkenzeller (17 November 1914 – 14 January 1991) was a German actress. She appeared in more than 80 films and television shows between 1935 and 1991.

Selected filmography

 Marriage Strike (1935) - Pepi, seine Frau
 The Royal Waltz (1935) - Theres Tomasoni, seine Tochter
 The Higher Command (1935) - Käte Traß
 Weiberregiment (1936) - Rosl
 Boccaccio (1936) - Fiametta, seine Frau
 Dangerous Crossing (1937) - Gerda Volkmann
 Wie der Hase läuft (1937) - Marianne, seine Tochter
 My Son the Minister (1937) - Nannette - seine Frau
 Spiel auf der Tenne (1937) - Lena Feldhofer
 The Model Husband (1937) - Doddy Wheeler
 Der Schimmelkrieg in der Holledau (1937) - Anna, beider Tochter
 Konzert in Tirol (1938) - Leni Lahntaler
 Diskretion - Ehrensache (1938) - Mary Hopkins
 Scheidungsreise (1938) - Marianne Delius
 Eine kleine Nachtmusik (1939) - Komtess Eugenie
 Opera Ball (1939) - Helene Hollinger
 Hochzeitsnacht (1941) - Vroni
 Der siebente Junge (1941) - Christine, seine Schwaegerin
 Ehe man Ehemann wird (1941) - Elli
 Alarmstufe V (1941) - Hilde Meindl
 Front Theatre (1942) - Lena Meinhardt-Andres
 Kohlhiesel's Daughters (1943) - Veronika Kohlhöfer
 The Bath in the Barn (1943) - Antje, seine Frau
 I'll Carry You in My Arms (1943) - Karin Hartung
 Alles aus Liebe (1943) - Inge
 Wo ist Herr Belling? (1945, unfinished film) - Pianistin Bettina Heinemann
 Hallo - Sie haben Ihre Frau vergessen (1949) - Barbara
  (1949) - Resi Schegerer
 Twelve Hearts for Charly (1949) - Gabriele
 The Woman from Last Night (1950) - Heidi
 Es begann um Mitternacht (1951)
 Stips (1951) - Katja Romberg
 Mikosch Comes In (1952) - Claire von Ferency
 At the Well in Front of the Gate (1952) - Mary Murphy
.* Such a Charade (1953) - Dorette Schilling
 Mailman Mueller (1953) - Charlotte Müller
 Emil and the Detectives (1954) - Seine Mutter Anna Tischbein
 Jackboot Mutiny (1955) - Sekretärin (uncredited)
 Lost Child 312 (1955) - Jo
 Ciske de Rat (1955)
 Die wilde Auguste (1956) - Baronin Asta von Hastig
 The First Day of Spring (1956) - Edith
 A Thousand Melodies (1956) - Tante Dele
 Jenny (1959)
 A Summer You Will Never Forget (1959) - Mrs. Dr.Manning
 Wegen Verführung Minderjähriger (1960) - Hanna Rugge
  (1961) - Maria Berger
 Am Sonntag will mein Süsser mit mir segeln gehn (1961) - Alice Ackermann, die Neureiche
 Heute gehn wir bummeln (1961) - Mrs. Brown
 The Merry Wives of Tyrol (1964) - Veronika Lechner
  (1969–1970, TV Series) - Steffi Rosen
 Satan's Brew (1976)
  (1988, TV Series) - Amelie Lorentz

References

External links

1914 births
1991 deaths
Actresses from Munich
People from the Kingdom of Bavaria
20th-century German actresses
German film actresses